Kusha Kapila (born 19 September 1989) is an Indian fashion editor, Internet celebrity, comedian, actress, and YouTuber from New Delhi, India.

Personal life 
Kapila is a Punjabi Hindu from New Delhi. She married Zorawar Singh Ahluwalia, a former employee at Diageo in 2017.

Career 
After graduation from National Institute of Fashion Technology in fashion design, she worked as a merchandising intern for Bhartiya International Limited based on Delhi for three months. Subsequently, she worked as a product design intern at Chisell Effects, in Noida. In 2013, she started working as a fashion correspondent for a Delhi-based clothing firm, Apparel Online.

In May 2014, she joined Razorfish Neev and started working as a copywriter. In the same year, she made her first debut with the television show Son of Abish hosted by Abish Mathew.

In 2016, she worked for the Times Internet as a fashion editor. Later, she joined iDiva as a content writer head. While working for iDiva, she created and played the fictional character, Billi Masi, which became a major hit, making her an Internet sensation.

In 2020, she appeared in an anthology Netflix film Ghost Stories. She was also in Netflix India's YouTube show Behensplaining.

In 2021, she performed in the Amazon Prime's comedy reality show LOL: Hasse Toh Phasse.

In 2022, she was seen in a reality sketch comedy show Case Toh Banta Hai of Amazon MiniTV. She also performed as a lead cast in Season 2 of Netflix TV series Masaba Masaba. She co-hosted the season 3 of Comicstaan. She made an appearance in Plan A Plan B. She also appeared as a part of jury on Season 7 of Koffee with Karan.

In February 2023, she appeared in Minus One: New Chapter and Selfiee.

Media 
In 2019, Kusha Kapila featured on the cover of Harper's Bazaar India.

In 2021, Kapila featured in Hindustan Times HT Brunch cover story.

In 2022, she featured on the cover of Cosmopolitan. In the same year, she got listed in the Forbes India's W-Power list.

Filmography

Films

Web series

References

External links 

 

1989 births
Living people
Fashion editors
Punjabi Hindus
Indian comedians
Indian actresses
21st-century Indian actresses
Indian YouTubers
YouTube channels launched in 2011